Phillips Farm, also known as Percy-Pitt Farm, is a historic home located at Suffolk, Virginia. The farm house was built about 1820, and is a 30-feet square, -story, frame house.  It has an English basement, gable roof, and features clerestory dormer windows. In 1848, a 13 feet by 30 feet addition was added to the west of the original structure. It is one of a few regional examples of a building commonly called a clerestory house or a clerestory dormer house.

It was added to the National Register of Historic Places in 1998.

References

Houses on the National Register of Historic Places in Virginia
Houses completed in 1820
Federal architecture in Virginia
Houses in Suffolk, Virginia
National Register of Historic Places in Suffolk, Virginia